is an anime television film, winner of the second annual Animax Taishō, an annual anime scriptwriting competition offered by Animax to award the best original anime scripts of the year. It aired on Animax in 2004.

Story
The Karugamo High School Baseball Team has not been doing well. After losing badly to the Eagles, many of the players leave, and the team is left with only eight players, one too few to play a game. Going against his principles, the main character Harumaki Shunpei decides to buy a baseball robot. However, since he does not have enough money, he ends up buying the maid robot named Azusa. Even though Azusa has a warm heart and strong determination, it doesn't appear that she stands a chance against her adversaries who were top-of-the-line baseball robots. The team's only hope seems to lie in a secret buried within Azusa's clouded past.

External links

 

2000s sports comedy films
2000s science fiction comedy films
2004 anime films
2004 television films
2004 films
Animated comedy films
Anime television films
Baseball in anime and manga
Comedy anime and manga
Japanese science fiction comedy films
Japanese animated science fiction films
Japanese sports comedy films
TMS Entertainment

ja:アズサ、お手伝いします!